Joseph Otsiman is a New York-based Ghanaian actor, noted for his role as Pastor John Moses in The Cursed Ones and Kojo in The Burial of Kojo. He is a two-time African Movie Academy Awards nominee.

Career

Otsiman played the title character, Kojo Bonsu in The Burial of Kojo, directed by Blitz the Ambassador.

He was nominated for Best Actor in a Supporting Role at the 2016 AMA Awards and Best actor in a Leading Role at the 2019 Africa Movie Academy Awards.

References

Living people
List of Ghanaian actors
Year of birth missing (living people)